The 1974 Southern Cross Rally, officially the Sun-Total Oil Southern Cross International Rally was the ninth running of the Southern Cross Rally. The rally took place between the 9th and the 13th of October 1974. The event covered 3,506 kilometres from Sydney to Port Macquarie.  It was won by Andrew Cowan and John Bryson, driving a Mitsubishi Lancer GSR.

Results

References

Rally competitions in Australia
Southern Cross Rally